Windows in the Jungle is the ninth studio album by British rock band 10cc, released in October 1983.

Background
The album became a return to the roots for 10cc as all the songs on the album were written together by Eric Stewart and Graham Gouldman, some of which were extended pieces with complex arrangements ("24 Hours", "Taxi! Taxi!", "The Secret Life of Henry"), reminiscent of the "Une Nuit a Paris" and "Feel the Benefit" from the earlier albums, and based on the unifying concept of love and life in the city.

The album also continued the formula established by the previous 10cc album Ten Out of 10 for which the band consisted of Eric Stewart and Graham Gouldman with other musicians taking part as session players, however again featuring long-time 10cc collaborators Rick Fenn and Stuart Tosh along with recent addition of Vic Emerson to the live lineup. However, the album marked the absence of Paul Burges for the first time since 1977 Deceptive Bends.

Windows in the Jungle was recorded in Strawberry Studios North, the first time 10cc recorded the album entirely there since 1976 How Dare You! as Strawberry Studios South was occupied at the beginning of the recording by The Moody Blues for the recording of The Present.

Eric Stewart recalled that the finished album did not meet his initial expectations: "Windows started as a concept album and I'm sorry I didn't pursue that goal, the pressure for the hit single always got in the way with 10cc albums.I longed to be like Pink Floyd and just go for large musical statements like "One Night in Paris" and "Feel the Benefit", but we were locked onto the singles roundabout, the 'quick buck', and it was impossible to break free at the time. The album was not really very successful, 10cc wise, anywhere in the rest of the world really, but in terms of sales today it was a minor hit."

The album turned out to be the last for 10cc for nine years, as well as their final album for Mercury Records and final to be recorded in their own Strawberry Studios. It was also the final studio album to feature musicians from the lineup formed during the making of Bloody Tourists (1978) (except for the brief appearance of Rick Fenn on Mirror Mirror).

Release and promotion
The album made only a brief appearance in the UK charts peaking at No. 70, but became a Top 10 in Netherlands peaking at No. 7.

Two singles were released from the album, UK only "24 Hours" in early 1983 featuring live versions of "I'm Not in Love" and "Dreadlock Holiday" from the 10th Anniversary tour in 1982, and "Feel the Love (Oomachasaooma)", which was given a tennis-themed music video by former 10cc members Godley and Creme. Both made low appearance in the UK charts at No. 78 and No. 87 respectively, but "Feel the Love" became a Top 10 hit in Netherlands again, also peaking at No. 7. A third single, released only in the Netherlands, was "Food for Thought" coupled with the non-album track "The Secret Life of Henry". It charted at No. 18.

The album was reissued in 2006 in Japan and in 2014 in Europe featuring single edits and b-sides as bonus tracks.

Track listing
All songs written by Eric Stewart and Graham Gouldman.
 "24 Hours"  – 8:09
 "Feel the Love (Oomachasaooma)"  – 5:10
 "Yes, I Am"  – 6:03
 "Americana Panorama"  – 3:45
 "City Lights"  – 3:34
 "Food for Thought"  – 3:34
 "Working Girls"  – 4:26
 "Taxi! Taxi!"  – 7:39

Personnel 
10cc
 Eric Stewart – lead vocals, keyboards, lead guitars, percussion
 Graham Gouldman – vocals, acoustic guitar, rhythm guitars, bass, guitar, percussion
 Rick Fenn – vocals, lead guitar, acoustic guitar
 Vic Emerson – keyboards
 Stuart Tosh – vocals, percussion, marimba, drums (on "Food for Thought")
with
 Mike Timony – keyboards
 Steve Gadd – drums, percussion
 Simon Phillips – drums
 Mel Collins – saxophones

Production
 Eric Stewart – producer, engineer 
 Graham Gouldman – producer 
 Martin Lawrence – engineer, mixing 
 Chris "CJ" Jones – assistant engineer 
 Ian Cooper – mastering at The Townhouse (London, UK)
 STd (Storm Thorgerson) – sleeve design

Charts performance

Weekly charts

Year-end charts

References

10cc albums
1983 albums
Mercury Records albums
Albums with cover art by Storm Thorgerson
Albums recorded at Strawberry Studios
Albums produced by Graham Gouldman
Albums produced by Eric Stewart